Klaipėda Sculpture Park (also known as Martynas Mažvydas Sculpture Park) is located in central Klaipėda, Lithuania. This park is one of the key artistic landmarks in the town. The L-shaped park occupies 12.2 hectares and has 116 modern sculptures created by 67 Lithuanian artists in 1977–1991. QR codes have been fixed to the sculpture plaques, giving extra info after waving a phone next to them.

In 1820–1959 here was the Memel Central Cemetery. Over 40,000 people are buried there. Some graves are marked by tombstones to this day.

Since 2006 the History Museum of Lithuania Minor is responsible for maintenance of the park.

References

External links 

 116 Park Sculptures (History Museum of Lithuania Minor)
 The Blacksmith's Museum (branch of the History Museum of Lithuania Minor)

Parks in Klaipėda
Sculpture gardens, trails and parks in Europe